Plan de Sánchez is a village in the municipality of Rabinal,  Baja Verapaz department, Guatemala. On July 18, 1982, while General Efraín Ríos Montt was President of Guatemala, a massacre was committed there by government forces during which over 200 people were killed. The massacre was a part of what is known as the scorched earth policy where the Guatemalan army eliminated up to 200,000 Mayan and indigenous  peoples in a 36-year civil war until 1996. In 2000 President Alfonso Portillo admitted that the  government was responsible for the massacre in the village.

See also
Plan de Sánchez massacre

Locator maps
 – Rabinal municipality

Populated places in the Baja Verapaz Department